Apostibes halmyrodes is a moth of the family Scythrididae. It was described by Edward Meyrick in 1921. It is found in Malawi, Namibia, South Africa and Zimbabwe.

The length of the forewings is 14–15 mm. The forewings are light grey irregularly sprinkled with whitish, tending to indicate very obscure lines on the veins. The hindwings are grey.

References

Scythrididae
Moths described in 1921
Moths of Africa